Highfield is a planned and approved CTrain light rail station in Calgary, Alberta, Canada part of the Green Line. Construction will begin in 2022 and complete in 2027 as part of construction stage one, segment one. The station is located in Calgary's oldest industrial area.    

The station will be at-grade, parallel to the existing freight railway tracks, and will have a bus loop. The station is expected to stimulate growth of the industrial park, because of increased transit connections for workers. The area has been identified by the City of Calgary to potentially become a generator for new commercial and high tech incubator development.

References 

CTrain stations
Railway stations scheduled to open in 2027